Luzviminda Gaba Tancangco is the first non-lawyer woman commissioner of the Philippine Commission on Elections. She was also its first female acting chairman (1998–1999).

Service
She served from 1998 to 2004, and is one of the six women to have been appointed to the Commission as of 2014.

Controversies
GMANews.TV reported that in August 2002, "NAMFREL and other civil society organizations" filed an "impeachment complaint" against "COMELEC Commissioner Luzviminda Tancangco", and that the complaint was "endorsed by Rep. Monico Puentevella".
The Congress of the Philippines dismissed the complaint on February 3, 2003 and found it "not sufficient in substance".
Ms. Tancangco continued to serve on the COMELEC until February 2, 2004.

References

External links
Palace urged to appoint women to 2 vacant Comelec posts
COMELEC home page
Home page of the House of Representatives of the Philippines

Year of birth missing (living people)
Living people
Filipino civil servants
Filipino women in politics
Commissioners of constitutional commissions of the Philippines
Estrada administration personnel